Norman McLeod Rogers  (July 25, 1894 – June 10, 1940) was a Canadian lawyer and statesman. He served as the Member of Parliament for Kingston, Ontario, Canada and as a cabinet minister in the government of Prime Minister William Lyon Mackenzie King. He was also an early biographer of King.

Rogers was born in Amherst, Nova Scotia and served in the military during World War I. He was educated at Acadia University and in 1919 he was elected a Rhodes Scholar. He went to University College, Oxford (University of Oxford), where he was awarded a BA Honours (MA) degree in Modern History, the B.Litt., and the BCL.

Rogers was private secretary to King from 1927 to 1929, then worked as a professor at Queen's University in Kingston. He was elected to the Parliament in 1935, and served under King as Minister of Labour until 1939, and then Minister of National Defence from 1939 until his death in 1940.

Rogers died in a plane crash on June 10, 1940 near Newtonville, Ontario, while en route from Ottawa to Toronto for a speaking engagement. On the day National Defence Minister Rogers died, Canada declared war on Italy.

Prime Minister King took the death of Rogers extremely hard. Rogers was a key Cabinet minister, and close advisor, and Canada was in the midst of World War II. The two men were friendly on a personal basis, and King may have been grooming Rogers to become his successor as prime minister.

Kingston/Norman Rogers Airport is named in his honour, as is a street in Kingston. A Canadian Coast Guard icebreaker was named after him; it has since been sold to Chile and renamed Contraalmirante Oscar Viel Toro.

Bibliography
W. A. M., 'Obituary: Norman McLeod Rogers, 1894–1940', Canadian Journal of Economics and Political Science/Revue canadienne d'Economique et de Science politique, vol. 6, no. 3 (August, 1940), pp. 476–478

References

External links
 Biography at Collections Canada
 

1894 births
1940 deaths
Canadian military personnel from Nova Scotia
People from Amherst, Nova Scotia
Acadia University alumni
Alumni of University College, Oxford
Canadian Rhodes Scholars
Liberal Party of Canada MPs
Members of the House of Commons of Canada from Ontario
Academic staff of the Queen's University at Kingston
Accidental deaths in Ontario
Canadian people of World War II
Victims of aviation accidents or incidents in Canada
Victims of aviation accidents or incidents in 1940
20th-century  Canadian lawyers
Canadian Expeditionary Force officers
Canadian military personnel of World War I